Ken Navarro (born June 9, 1953) is an American contemporary jazz guitarist.

Career
Navarro worked as a studio musician in Los Angeles, performing with Dave Koz, Nell Carter, and Doc Severinsen. In 1990, Navarro released his debut album, The River Flows, on his own record label. His second album was nominated for a Grammy Award. His 26 albums have included appearances by Dave Weckl, John Patitucci, Chad Wackerman, Brandon Fields, and Eric Marienthal. Navarro has also produced albums for saxophonist Eric Darius, Tony Craddock Jr.and pianist Jay Rowe.

On the smooth jazz chart at Billboard magazine, his song "You Are Everything" reached No. 6, "Juliet" reached No. 7, "When We Dance" reached No. 11 and "Ruby Lane" reached No. 10.

Discography

References

External links
 Official website
 Official YouTube channel
 

20th-century American guitarists
21st-century American guitarists
American jazz guitarists
American people of Italian descent
Guitarists from Maryland
Smooth jazz guitarists
Living people
1963 births
American jazz musicians
Jazz musicians from Maryland